Hamidou Tangara (born 12 November 1976) is a former footballer who is last known to have played as a goalkeeper for FC Mantois. Born in France, he is a Mali international.

Career

Tangara started his career with French fourth tier side PSG B. In 2003, he signed for Luçon in the French fifth tier. After that, Tangara signed for French fourth tier club Racing Club de France. In 2006, he signed for FC Mantois in the French fifth tier.

References

External links
 

Malian footballers
Living people
Mali international footballers
Association football goalkeepers
1976 births
Luçon FC players
French people of Malian descent
French footballers
Championnat National 2 players
Championnat National 3 players
Racing Club de France Football players
FC Mantois 78 players